Libya (LBA) competed at the 2005 Mediterranean Games in Almería, Spain. The nation had a total number of 34 participants (34 men and 0 women).

Medals

Gold
 Weightlifting
Men's 85 kg (Snatch)
 Mohamed Eshtiwi

Bronze
 Football
Men's Team Competition
 Mohamed Ben Nabia, Mohamed El-Mughraby, Abddrahman Ezwawi, Mansur Agala, Ayman El-Hagi, Abdissalam Msallem, Ala Mohamed, Ibrahim Abda, Mohamed Esnani, Marwan Almabrok, Muhsan Ashrif, Mohamed Gbrail, Hamed Ahniash, Zakaria Benmusa, Walid El-Khatroushi, Nabil Hndi, Ahmed Wafa, Mohamed Fares, Ante Cacic, Rida Ateya, and Ramadan El Shebli

See also
 Libya at the 2004 Summer Olympics
 Libya at the 2008 Summer Olympics

References
 Official Site

Nations at the 2005 Mediterranean Games
2005
Mediterranean Games